The battle of Suceava may refer to:

Battle of Suceava (1595), during the Moldavian Magnate Wars
Battle of Suceava (1653), during the Khmelnytsky Uprising